Ralph Pomeroy may refer to:
Ralph Pomeroy (gynecologist) (1867–1925), American gynecologist
Ralph Pomeroy (poet) (1926–1999), American poet
Ralph E. Pomeroy (1930–1952), recipient of the Medal of Honor